Mahrez Mebarek (born February 11, 1985) is an Algerian former swimmer, who specialized in freestyle events. He is a multiple-time Algerian record holder in long-distance freestyle (400, 800, and 1500 m).

Mebarek made his official debut at the 2004 Summer Olympics in Athens, where he qualified for two swimming events. In the 400 m freestyle, he challenged seven other swimmers on the third heat, where South Korea's Park Tae-Hwan was disqualified for a false start. Mebarek edged out Slovenia's Bojan Zdešar to take a fourth spot and dip under a 4-minute barrier by 0.90 of a second in 3:59.10. In his second event, 200 m freestyle, Mebarek shared a thirty-fifth place tie with Macedonia's Aleksandar Malenko in the preliminaries with a time of 1:53.00.

At the 2008 Summer Olympics in Beijing, Mebarek qualified for the second time in the men's 200 m freestyle by eclipsing a FINA B-standard entry time of 1:52.03 from the EDF Swimming Open in Paris, France. He challenged six other swimmers on the second heat, including four-time Olympian Andrei Zaharov of Moldova. He edged out Kazakhstan's Artur Dilman to take a third spot by 0.24 of a second, posting his lifetime best of 1:52.66. Mebarek failed to advance into the semifinals, as he placed fifty-first overall in the preliminaries.

References

External links
NBC Olympics Profile

1985 births
Living people
Algerian male freestyle swimmers
Olympic swimmers of Algeria
Swimmers at the 2004 Summer Olympics
Swimmers at the 2008 Summer Olympics
African Games bronze medalists for Algeria
African Games medalists in swimming
Competitors at the 2003 All-Africa Games
21st-century Algerian people